Kanyam कन्याम is a town and a tourist destination in Ilam District of Nepal. This comes under Suryodaya Municipality  in Ilam District in the Province No. 1 of eastern Nepal.

Kanyam is known for its green tea garden and picnic spots. It is known as "queen of the eastern Nepal" due to its natural environment.
Every year thousands of tourists visit here because of its climate and greenery. People also come here for honeymoon and it is one of the top destinations for couples.

References

Populated places in Ilam District